Holly in the Hills is a compilation album by American rock and roll singer Buddy Holly, including songs featuring Bob Montgomery originally released under "Buddy & Bob". The album was released as an LP record in both mono and stereo formats in January 1965.

Holly in the Hills was Buddy Holly's fifth posthumously released album and the fourth album to feature previously unreleased material. The original recordings were overdubbed by the Fireballs in 1964 and 1965.

The album was released on compact disc in 2002 by BGO Records in the UK.

Track listing
Side A
 "I Wanna Play House with You"
 "Door to My Heart"
 "Fool's Paradise"	
 "I Gambled My Heart"
 "What to Do"
 "Wishing"
Side B
 "Down the Line"
 "Soft Place in My Heart"
 "Lonesome Tears"	
 "Gotta Get You Near Me Blues"
 "Flower of My Heart"
 "You And I Are Through"

Charts

References

External links

Buddy Holly compilation albums
1965 compilation albums
Albums produced by Norman Petty
Coral Records compilation albums
Compilation albums published posthumously